Hantzsch ester refers to an organic compound with the formula HN(MeC=C(CO2Et))2CH2 where Me = methyl (CH3) and Et = ethyl (C2H5).  It is a light yellow solid.  The compound is an example of a 1,4-dihydropyridine. It is named after Arthur Rudolf Hantzsch who described its synthesis in 1881. The compound is a hydride donor, e.g., for reduction of imines to amines.  It is a synthetic analogue of NADH, a naturally occurring dihydropyridine.

Preparation
Hantzsch ester can be made with a Hantzsch pyridine synthesis where  formaldehyde, two equivalents of ethyl acetoacetate and ammonium acetate are combined to afford the product in high yield.

Structure
As confirmed by X-ray crystallography, Hantzsch ester has a planar C5N core.

Further reading

See also
 Hantzsch pyrrole synthesis

References 

Dihydropyridines
Pyridine forming reactions
Heterocycle forming reactions
Name reactions
Multiple component reactions